Eben Francis Stone (August 3, 1822 – January 22, 1895) was a U.S. Representative from Massachusetts.

Stone was born in Newburyport, Massachusetts to Ebenezer and Fanny (Coolidge) Stone.

Stone attended North Andover Academy and graduated from Harvard University in 1843 and from Harvard Law School in 1846.
He was admitted to the bar in 1847 and commenced practice in Newburyport, Massachusetts.
He served as president of the common council in 1851.
He served in the Massachusetts Senate in 1857, 1858, and 1861.

Stone enlisted in the Union Army during the Civil War, and commanded the 48th Regiment Massachusetts Volunteer Infantry of the Massachusetts Volunteer Militia.
Stone served as the eleventh mayor of Newburyport in 1867.
Stone served as member of the Massachusetts House of Representatives in 1867, 1877, 1878, and 1880.

Stone was elected as a Republican to the Forty-seventh, Forty-eighth, and Forty-ninth Congresses (March 4, 1881 – March 3, 1887).
He was not a candidate for renomination in 1886.
He resumed the practice of law in Newburyport, Massachusetts, where he died January 22, 1895.
Stone was interred in Oak Hill Cemetery.

See also
 1877 Massachusetts legislature
 1878 Massachusetts legislature

References

  Headley, Phineas Camp: Public men of to-day: being biographies of the President and Vice-President of the United States, each member of the Cabinet, the United States Senators and the members of the House of Representatives of the Forty-Seventh Congress, the Chief Justice and justices of the Supreme Court of the United, and of the Governors of the Several States., pages 590–591, (1882).

Notes

External links
The 48th Massachusetts Infantry Regiment (Massachusetts Volunteer Militia).

1822 births
1895 deaths
Harvard Law School alumni
Republican Party members of the Massachusetts House of Representatives
Republican Party Massachusetts state senators
Mayors of Newburyport, Massachusetts
American militia officers
Republican Party members of the United States House of Representatives from Massachusetts
19th-century American politicians
Massachusetts Republican Party chairs